Javier "Xavi" Forés Querol (born 16 September 1985) is a motorcycle road racer from Spain. For 2020 he competed in the Superbike World Championship aboard a Kawasaki ZX-10RR, and for 2021 in both British Superbike Championship for FHO Racing using BMWs, and FIM Endurance World Championship for BMW Motorrad World Endurance Team.

For 2022, Forés competed in World Superbikes as a replacement rider for Team Goeleven, in MotoE and Endurance racing with co-riders David Checa and Chaz Davies. At the season end he was drafted into World Superbikes for the final three races after a brief spell with Eurosport as an expert pundit on World Superbike racing.

Career
Forés won the CEV Stock Extreme Championship in 2010 and 2013, the European Superstock 1000 Championship in 2013 and the IDM Superbike Championship in 2014.

He has also competed in the 125cc World Championship, the Supersport World Championship, the FIM Superstock 1000 Cup and the Moto2 World Championship. In 2019 he finished the British Superbike Championship in ninth position.

Career statistics

FIM CEV Stock Extreme

Races by year
(key) (Races in bold indicate pole position; races in italics indicate fastest lap)

IDM Superbike Championship

Races by year
(key) (Races in bold indicate pole position; races in italics indicate fastest lap)

Grand Prix motorcycle racing

By season

By class

Races by year
(key) (Races in bold indicate pole position; races in italics indicate fastest lap)

 Half points awarded as less than two thirds of the race distance (but at least three full laps) was completed.

Supersport World Championship

Races by year
(key) (Races in bold indicate pole position; races in italics indicate fastest lap)

British Superbike Championship

Races by year
(key) (Races in bold indicate pole position; races in italics indicate fastest lap)

Superbike World Championship

Races by year
(key) (Races in bold indicate pole position; races in italics indicate fastest lap)

References

External links

 

125cc World Championship riders
Moto2 World Championship riders
MotoGP World Championship riders
Spanish motorcycle racers
1985 births
Living people
Superbike World Championship riders
Supersport World Championship riders
FIM Superstock 1000 Cup riders
Audi Sport TT Cup drivers
British Superbike Championship riders
People from Ribera Alta (comarca)
Sportspeople from the Province of Valencia
MotoE World Cup riders
Avintia Racing MotoGP riders